The Canadian Census of Agriculture, is a census conducted every five years by Statistics Canada, alongside the national census, for the purposes of gathering Canadian agricultural industry, farm operator, and farm data.

Overview 
As mandated by the Statistics Act, Statistics Canada carries out a Census of Agriculture every five years. For this purpose, Statistics Canada surveys every agricultural operation and agricultural operator in Canada to construct a detailed, local understanding of demographics, commodities, operation structure, technology spread, and other notable aspects of agricultural data.

Like the United States Census of Agriculture, farm operators are obligated to respond to the census. Unlike the Census of Agriculture, there is no minimum amount of agricultural operation income produced and sold for an agricultural operation to be considered.

The Census of Agriculture is conducted concurrently with the larger Census of Population. Doing so allows for savings within the administrative costs, as well as for a direct linkage with the socio-demographic results present in the Census of Population, which is used to further inform the results of the Census of Agriculture. This linkage has been running since 1971.

The latest Census of Agriculture in Canada was conducted in May 2016.

History 
Following after the designation of the national census in the Constitution Act of 1867, the first Census of Agriculture was conducted in Manitoba in 1896, with Alberta and Saskatchewan being added in 1901. In 1956 the Census of Agriculture was expanded to the rest of Canada, and at the same time would begin to be conducted concurrently to the Census of Population.

Like the Census of Population, the Census of Agriculture shifted from the responsibility of the Ministry of Agriculture to the Ministry of Trade and Commerce in 1912, and finally to the Dominion Bureau of Statistics (presently Statistics Canada) in 1918.

The 2016 Census of Agriculture recorded 193,492 farms and 271,935 farm operators.

Data collected from Census of Agriculture 
The Census of Agriculture, given its interests in presenting a thorough understanding of the entirety of the agricultural sector in Canada, collects a wide variety of data about individual farm operations and operators. Examples of information collected include:

Agricultural Operator Data:
 Number of Operators
 Age of Operators
 Gender of Operators
 Education of Operators
 Responsibilities of Operators
Agricultural Operation Data:
 Type of operating arrangements
 Main farm location
 Size (area) of operation
 Land use and land tenure
 Area and type of crops
 Number and type of livestock
 Land management practices
 Market value of land and buildings
 Number and market value of farm machinery by type
 Total gross farm receipts
 Total farm business operating expenses
 Total number of employees and number of employees paid on a full, part-time or seasonal basis
 Presence of Direct marketing
 Succession planning
 Presence of Renewable energy producing systems.
The Census of Agriculture includes producers of both traditional agricultural products as well as other, more exotic to Canada products. Special categorization is given to operations in the territories, including the herding of wild animals, breeding of sled dogs, and harvesting of indigenous plants and berries.

Data collected under the Census of Agriculture is protected under the Statistics Act, to ensure that all information provided during the census remains confidential. Like the Census of Population, data is held confidentially and anonymized as necessary.

2016 Census of Agriculture 
The most recent Census of Agriculture, in May 2016, included a questionnaire containing 183 questions, spanning 16 pages. However respondents were only required to answer questions applying to their agricultural operations, thus, on average each respondent only answered 20% of questions on the questionnaire. Questions on four new topics were added to the 2016 Census of Agriculture, including adoption of technologies, direct marketing, succession planning and renewable energy systems. There were several types of data collected to assess information on current agriculture, as an important commodity in the Canadian economy.

Census publication and use 
Statistics Canada provides the data to government and public entities at various levels to inform agricultural policy, as well as to establish benchmarks of crops, livestock, and farm finances. The statistical sets, as well as analysis by Statistics Canada is published in the years following a Census of Agriculture.

The Census of Agriculture has been useful in many scientific studies, including a study on land use for agriculture in Canada. It has also been used in the past to gauge the effects of climate change within the prairie provinces of Canada.

See also 
 Census in Canada
 Agriculture in Canada
 Economy of Canada
 Statistics Act

References 

Censuses in Canada
Agriculture in Canada
Agricultural censuses
1896 establishments in Canada